Mokra Mountain (Macedonian and Serbian: Мокра Планина,  Mokra Planina,  "Wet Mountain") may refer to:
 Mokra Mountain, North Macedonia (Jakupica), a mountain in North Macedonia
 , a mountain in Serbia

or:
 , a mountain in Montenegro